There are a variety of sports in Nebraska. Private organizations, colleges and universities, and other clubs across the state that offer sports throughout Nebraska.

Professional sports
The following are professional sports teams that currently play in the state, or have been confirmed as future teams.

College sports

Amateur sports
There are several semi-professional or club sports in Nebraska.

See also
 Sports in Omaha

References

Nebraska
Sports teams